The term Brinks robbery may refer to:
The Great Brinks Robbery in 1950, in Boston, Massachusetts
Brinks robbery (1981) in Rockland County, New York
Brink's-Mat robbery of 1983 in Hounslow, London
D.B. Tuber Brinks robbery of 2008 in Monroe, Washington